This is a list of museums in Nuremberg, Germany:

Active museums

Defunct museums

References

External links 

 The Nuremberg Municipal Museums 
 Museums in Nuremberg on Tourismus Nuremberg 

Nuremberg
 
Nuremberg
Museums